Coccothrinax concolor is a palm which is endemic to Haiti.

Henderson and colleagues (1995) considered C. concolor to be a synonym of Coccothrinax miraguama.

References

concolor
Trees of Haiti
Endemic flora of Haiti
Plants described in 1929
Taxa named by Max Burret